All About You is a 2001 romantic comedy film written and directed by Christine Swanson. The film stars Renée Elise Goldsberry as a woman who tries to find love and ends up in a complicated romantic triangle. The film had its world premiere on August 4, 2001, at the Urbanworld Film Festival. Swanson initially had some difficulty in finding a distributor for the film, as distributors stated it was "not edgy enough".

Swanson released a followup entitled All About Us in 2007.

Premise
Nicole is in love with her boyfriend Robbie and is ready to start talking about marriage. Unfortunately for her, he hasn’t even thought about a future with her.  She moves to San Francisco to start a new life, and ends up with Robbie's brother Brian as her roommate for one month. Just as Nicole and Brian realize they have feelings for each other, Robbie wants to try a relationship with Nicole again.

Cast

Reception
DVD Talk and Chicago Reader both praised the film's acting while also criticizing the script as being overly predictable.

Awards
Best Film at the American Black Film Festival (2003, won)
Audience Favorite Award at the Roxbury Film Festival (2003, won)
Jury Award for Best Feature Film at the Hollywood Black Film Festival (2002, won)

References

External links
 
 
 
 All About You at Faith Filmworks
 All About Us at Faith Filmworks

2001 films
2001 independent films
2000s romantic comedy-drama films
2000s English-language films
American romantic comedy-drama films
American independent films
African-American romance films
2001 comedy films
2002 comedy films
2002 films
2001 drama films
2002 drama films
2000s American films